The potential of on-shore wind power in Delaware is minimal, having a potential of generating at most 22 GWh/year. Delaware's principal wind potential is from offshore wind. A 2012 assessment estimates that 15,038 MW of offshore wind turbines could generate 60,654 GWh/year. Delaware generated 11,522 GWh from all generating sources in 2011.

2 MW of large scale wind capacity has been constructed in Delaware. A single 256-foot tall, 210-ton turbine at the University of Delaware in Lewes was built in 2010 for generating and educational purposes. It produced 5 GWh of electricity in 2015. There are no projects under construction, but there is a planned offshore wind power project that would produce 120 MW

The state of Delaware ran a request for proposals (RFP) during 2006-2007 that is notable as the first known RFP, world-wide, in which offshore wind power competed equally against coal and natural gas power alternatives.

Proposed projects
The Delaware Offshore Wind Farm was a proposed project which did not advance. Two other off shore wind farms are proposed for offshore Delaware, one supplying energy to Maryland and the other to New Jersey.

See also
Solar power in Delaware

References

External links 
Offshore Wind Power Delaware Project